Double L Site, RI-958 is a historic site located in Scituate, Rhode Island, United States.

The site was added to the US National Historic Register on September 12, 1985 and contains prehistoric archaeological evidence.

References

Scituate, Rhode Island
Buildings and structures on the National Register of Historic Places in Rhode Island
Buildings and structures in Providence County, Rhode Island
National Register of Historic Places in Providence County, Rhode Island